Martin Dausch (born 4 March 1986) is a German footballer who plays as a midfielder for FC Memmingen.

Career
Dausch signed with MSV Duisburg on 11 January 2015.

For the 2017–18 season, he moved to 1. FC Saarbrücken.

Dausch retired from professional-level football in 2019.

References

External links

1986 births
Living people
People from Memmingen
Sportspeople from Swabia (Bavaria)
Association football midfielders
German footballers
Footballers from Bavaria
2. Bundesliga players
3. Liga players
Regionalliga players
Oberliga (football) players
Bayernliga players
VfB Stuttgart II players
VfR Aalen players
1. FC Union Berlin players
MSV Duisburg players
1. FC Saarbrücken players
FC Memmingen players